Uolbut is a rural locality (a selo) in Zharkhansky Rural Okrug of Olyokminsky District in the Sakha Republic, Russia, located  from Olyokminsk, the administrative center of the district and  from Tokko, the administrative center of the rural okrug. Its population as of the 2002 Census was 313. The closest airport to the city center of Uolbut is Cherskiy Airport, at approximately 480 kilometers away.

References

Notes

Sources
Official website of the Sakha Republic. Registry of the Administrative-Territorial Divisions of the Sakha Republic. Olyokminsky District. 

Rural localities in Olyokminsky District